The 2007 World Indoor Target Archery Championships were held in Izmir, Turkey from 13 to 17 March 2007.

Medal summary (individual)

Medal summary (team)

Medal tally

References

E
2007
International archery competitions hosted by Turkey
World Indoor Archery Championships
Sports competitions in Izmir
2000s in İzmir